Allahabad West is a constituency of the Uttar Pradesh Legislative Assembly covering the city of Allahabad West in the Prayagraj district of Uttar Pradesh, India.
  
Allahabad West is one of five assembly constituencies in the Phulpur Lok Sabha constituency. Since 2008, this assembly constituency is numbered 261 amongst 403 constituencies.

Currently this seat belongs to Bharatiya Janta Party candidate Siddharth Nath Singh who won in last Assembly election of 2022 Uttar Pradesh Legislative Elections defeating Samajwadi Party candidate Richa Singh by a margin of 29,873 votes.

Members of Legislative Assembly

^ by poll

Election results

2022

2017 result

2012 result

2007 result

2005 by-election

2004 by-election

References

External links
 

Assembly constituencies of Uttar Pradesh
Politics of Allahabad